Samuel Gibbs may refer to:

Samuel Gibbs, Invasion of Java (1811)
Sam Gibbs